The second and final season of The Lying Game, based on the book series of the same name by Sara Shepard, premiered on January 8 and concluded on March 12, 2013 on ABC Family. As the twins' saga continues in season two, there are more surprises, secrets and lies. The girls' recently revealed birth mother Rebecca lures Sutton into her plans for the Mercer family. Emma grows closer to Thayer, while still being drawn to Ethan, who has started to reconnect with Sutton. Kristin feels betrayed after Ted came clean about his long ago affair with Rebecca, but Ted might be hiding even more shocking revelations. And Mads connects with a mysterious new guy in town who brings a whole new level of secrets with him.

Cast and characters

Main cast 
 Alexandra Chando as Emma Becker and Sutton Mercer
 Andy Buckley as Ted Mercer
 Allie Gonino as Laurel Mercer
 Alice Greczyn as Madeline "Mads" Rybak
 Blair Redford as Ethan Whitehorse
 Charisma Carpenter as Rebecca Sewell
 Helen Slater as Kristin Mercer

Recurring cast 
 Adrian Pasdar as Alec Rybak
 Tyler Christopher as Dan Whitehorse
 Christian Alexander as Thayer Rybak
 Ryan Rottman as Jordan Lyle
 Yara Martinez as Theresa Lopez

Guest stars 
Adam Brooks as Baz
Craig Nigh as Officer Harry
The Good Mad as Strangeworthy

Episodes

References 

2013 American television seasons